The men's 500 m race of the 2011 World Single Distance Speed Skating Championships was held on March 13 at 12:45 (round 1) and 14:15 (round 2) local time.

Results

References

2011 World Single Distance Speed Skating Championships